

Gmina Łazy is an urban-rural gmina (administrative district) in Zawiercie County, Silesian Voivodeship, in southern Poland.

The gmina contains part of the protected area called Eagle Nests Landscape Park.

Villages
Apart from the town of Łazy, Gmina Łazy contains the villages and settlements of Kądzielów, Kuźnica Masłońska, Rokitno Szlacheckie and Turza.

Neighbouring gminas
Gmina Łazy is bordered by the towns of Dąbrowa Górnicza, Poręba and Zawiercie, and by the gminas of Klucze, Ogrodzieniec and Siewierz.

References

Lazy
Zawiercie County